Luisella babai is a species of sea slug, an aeolid nudibranch, a marine gastropod mollusc in the family Samlidae.

Etymology
The specific epithet babai honors the Japanese malacologist Kikutaro Baba.

Distribution
This species was described from the Mediterranean Sea where it is a fairly common species. It is also present in the Adriatic Sea and it has also been reported from the Atlantic coasts of Spain, Portugal and Senegal. It inhabits rocky bottoms at depths of 5 to 50 m.

Description
Body is usually white to light blue, elongated and translucent with a white edge and a long sharp pointed tail. Cerata are arranged in groups of 3-9. They show the same body color with yellow-orange rings on the terminal parts. The two long tentacles in their anterior part have the same color of the body. Also the two rhinophores in their upper part shows the same color of the body, with a yellow terminal part. Digestive system and liver are visible in transparency.

This species is rather similar to Samla bicolor (Kelaart, 1858), but S. bicolor can be found only in the Indo-Pacific.

Biology
Hermaphrodite, like all nudibranchs, it deposits on the branches of the hydrozoans a white gelatinous spiral cord composed of thousands of eggs from which five to eight days later veliger larvae hatch. These nudibranchs feed on hydroids , manly Campanularia, Bougainvillia and Eudendrium species.

Gallery

Bibliography
 Gary R. McDonald, University of California Santa Cruz Nudibranch Systematic Index University of California Santa Cruz (PDF), in Institute of Marine Sciences (2006).
 Egidio Trainito, Nudibranchi del Mediterraneo. Guida al riconoscimento dei molluschi opistobranchi, 2005ª ed., Milano, Il Castello, 2005, .

References

External links
 

Samlidae
Gastropods described in 1972
Molluscs of the Mediterranean Sea
Fauna of the Adriatic Sea